The Real Me or Real Me may refer to:

Television episodes 
 "Real Me" (Buffy the Vampire Slayer)
 "The Real Me" (Sex and the City)

Music

Albums
 The Real Me (Patti Austin album), 1988
 The Real Me, a 2000 album by Svala
 The Real Me (Bea Alonzo album), 2008

Songs
 Real Me (Ayumi song), 2002
 "The Real Me" (Kiev Connolly & The Missing Passengers song), 1989
 "The Real Me" (The Who song), 1973
 "The Real Me", a song by The Eric Burdon Band from Sun Secrets
 "The Real Me", a song by Natalie Grant from Awaken

See also 
 Realme, a Chinese smartphone and AIoT product manufacturer 
 Really Me, a 2011 Canadian teen TV sitcom